King Charles is a 1913 British silent historical film directed by Wilfred Noy and starring P.G. Ebbutt and Dorothy Bellew. The film is based on Harrison Ainsworth's 1857 novel Ovingdean Grange. Following his army's defeat at the Battle of Worcester, Charles II manages to escape to Continental Europe.

Cast
 P.G. Ebbutt as King Charles II  
 Dorothy Bellew as Dulcia Beard

References

Bibliography
 Low, Rachael. The History of British Film, Volume III: 1914-1918. Routledge, 1997.

External links
 

1913 films
1910s historical drama films
British historical drama films
British silent feature films
Films directed by Wilfred Noy
Films based on British novels
Films set in England
Films set in the 1650s
British black-and-white films
1913 drama films
1910s English-language films
1910s British films
Silent historical drama films